"El baile del gorila" is the debut single by Spanish singer Melody, taken from her debut album De pata negra. She released it in 2001, at the age of 10.

The song debuted at number 2 in Spain for the week of 7 July 2001, climbing to number one two weeks later. It was the dance hit of that summer in Spain.

Track listing

Charts

Weekly charts

Year-end charts

Certifications

References

External links 
 

2001 songs
2001 debut singles
Melody (Spanish singer) songs
Epic Records singles